was an annual program made by Monster9, the same company that produces series such as Kinniku Banzuke and SASUKE and broadcast on TBS TV.

Format
Competitors take on a series of physical and mental events, where better performance is rewarded with more points. Examples of events include "Tail Impossible", a running race where the last few competitors are eliminated every lap, and "Shotgun Touch", where competitors must try to catch up to a falling volleyball. Whoever has the most points at the end of the competition wins. The Pro Sportsman Tournament (プロスポーツマン大会) was traditionally held on New Year's Day while the Celebrity Survival Battle (芸能人サバイバルバトル) was held in the spring and fall. Additionally an Amateur Sportsman Tournament (アマチュアスポーツマン大会) was held on 3 occasions in the spring and fall of 1995 and in the fall of 1996, with individual event winners selected only (no overall winner).

In 2010, Monster9 held a "Monster Box Special" rather than the traditional format. 50 competitors were invited, including several members of Muscle Musical and three SASUKE All-Stars. Whoever could survive the Monster Box the longest was declared the winner.

Winners

International Competitors
Occasionally, international competitors will be invited. Notable international competitors include American decathletes Paul Terek and Bryan Clay, and Philadelphia Phillies outfielder Shane Victorino.

Japanese game shows
Sports entertainment
TBS Television (Japan) original programming